Carl Rudolf "Rudy" Berghult (April 15, 1905 – February 16, 2000) was the mayor of Duluth, Minnesota from 1937 - 1942.  He was the youngest mayor of a U.S. city larger than 100,000 at 31 and Duluth's first native-born mayor.  He is credited with helping secure the government funding for the construction of Duluth's Blatnik Bridge.

See also
List of mayors of Duluth, Minnesota

1905 births
2000 deaths
Mayors of Duluth, Minnesota
20th-century American politicians